Panegyra metria is a species of moth of the family Tortricidae. It is found in Ghana.

The wingspan is about 10.5 mm. The ground colour of the forewings is grey-brown and the costa whitish to two-thirds, with three sinuate concavities from the second of which a fascia extends to before
The mid-dorsum. The apical and terminal areas are whitish, the latter with minute brownish dots on a white ground. The hindwings are pale brownish.

References

Moths described in 2005
Tortricini
Moths of Africa
Taxa named by Józef Razowski